Rosaline is a character in Romeo and Juliet.

Rosaline may also refer to:

 Rosaline (band), American post-hardcore band
 Rosaline lace, late 17th century Venetian needle lace
 Lady Rosaline, a character in Love's Labour's Lost
 Rosaline, a 2022 romantic comedy about the Romeo and Juliet character.

People
 Rosaline Bozimo (born 1946), Nigerian lawyer and Chief Justice of Delta State
 Rosaline Elbay, Egyptian actress and writer
 Rosaline Margaret Frank (1864–1954), New Zealand photographer
 Rosaline Masson (1867–1947), Scottish writer of novels, biographies, histories and other works

See also
 Rosalina (disambiguation)